WHHS can refer to:

WHHS (radio station)
Walnut Hills High School
West Haven High School
West Hempstead High School
West Hills High School
Westchester Hebrew High School
Western Heights High School
Western Hills High School (disambiguation), several schools
Westmont Hilltop High School
Whitehouse High School
White House High School
Wilmer Hutchins High School
Winter Haven High School